Sir William Lockyer Freestun, KCT, KBE, (1804 – 16 April 1862) was a British Liberal and Whig politician.

Family
Freestun was the son of Edward Freestun and Mary née Lockyer, daughter of William Lockyer. He married Josefa Benita, relict of Charles Pratt, in 1846.

Military career
He entered the army as ensign in the 5th Regiment of Foot, serving for 23 years, and was also on the staff of The Royal British Legion under Sir George de Lacy Evans between 1835 and 1837, during which time he became colonel and was wounded three times. During this time, he became a Knight Commander under the Order of Charles III, and also received the first class of the orders of San Fernando and of Isabella the Catholic.

Between 1840 and 1842, Freestun served on the staff in Syria, holding the local rank of Major, as Assistant Adjutant-General, with him then being presented with a gold medal by the Sultan. During a visit to Jerusalem in 1841 he was admitted as a Knight of the Holy Sepulchre.

Political career

Freestun was first elected Whig MP for Weymouth and Melcombe Regis at the 1847 general election, and held the seat until 1859, when he stood as a Liberal but was defeated.

Other activities
Knighted in 1860, Freestun was also a Deputy Lieutenant for Dorset and a Justice of the Peace for the same county.

References

External links
 

Whig (British political party) MPs for English constituencies
Deputy Lieutenants of Dorset
UK MPs 1847–1852
UK MPs 1852–1857
UK MPs 1857–1859
1804 births
1862 deaths
English justices of the peace